2018 Thai League 4 Southern Region is the 9th season of the League competition since its establishment in 2009. It is in the fourth tier of the Thai football league system.

Changes from Last Season

Promoted Clubs

Promoted from the 2017 Thailand Amateur League Southern Region
 Hatyai City

Relegated Clubs

Relegated to the 2018 Thailand Amateur League Southern Region
 Sungaipadee

Expansion Clubs
 Yala United Club-licensing football club didn't pass to play 2018 Thai League 4 Southern Region. This team is banned 2 years and Relegated to 2020 Thailand Amateur League Southern Region.

Reserving Clubs
 Krabi U-23 is Krabi Reserving this team which join Southern Region first time.

Teams

Stadium and locations

Foreign players

A T4 team could registered five foreign players by at least one player from AFC member countries and at least one player from ASEAN member countries. A team can use four foreign players on the field in each game, including at least one player from the AFC member countries or ASEAN member countries (3+1).
Note :: players who released during summer transfer window;: players who registered during summer transfer window;↔: players who have dual nationality by half-caste or naturalization.

League table

Positions by round

Results by round

Results 1st and 2nd match for each team

Results 3rd match for each team
In the third leg, the winner on head-to-head result of the first and the second leg will be home team. If head-to-head result are tie, must to find the home team from head-to-head goals different. If all of head-to-head still tie, must to find the home team from penalty kickoff on the end of each second leg match (This penalty kickoff don't bring to calculate points on league table, it's only the process to find the home team on third leg).

Season statistics

Top scorers
As of 25 August 2018.

Hat-tricks

Attendances

Attendances by home match played

Source: Thai League 4
Note: Some error of T4 official match report 15 July 2018 (Krabi (B) 0–1 Pattani).
 Some error of T4 official match report 5 August 2018 (Krabi (B) 3–2 Phattalung).
 Some error of T4 official match report 25 August 2018 (Krabi (B) 2–4 Hatyai City).

References

External links
Thai League 4
http://www.thailandsusu.com/webboard/index.php?topic=388919.0
https://web.archive.org/web/20180107103557/http://www.smmsport.com/news.php?category=74

Regional League South Division seasons